Swenzia is an extinct genus of coelacanthid fish from the late Jurassic of France. It contains a single species, S. latimerae, which was originally described as Wenzia latimerae.  Because the generic name Wenzia was already preoccupied by a snail, the generic name was amended to Swenzia. It is the fossil genus most closely related to the living coelacanth, Latimeria.

See also

 Sarcopterygii
 List of sarcopterygians
 List of prehistoric bony fish

References

Prehistoric lobe-finned fish genera
Latimeriidae
Fossil taxa described in 2005